Mike Caron is an American television director and owner of production company Mike Caron Productions.

Career
Caron began his career as an actor on the CBS television show Young and the Restless  from 1995 to 1996. Caron was then asked to become a stage manager on Passions, despite having no background as a stage manager. After receiving more work on soap operas, he became associate director on Nickelodeon’s Drake & Josh. He later went on to continue working with Schneider's Bakery on Zoey 101, iCarly, Victorious, and Sam & Cat. 

While working on Henry Danger and Game Shakers he started directing episodes of the shows. He later went on to direct Danger Force. In addition, Caron has directed a short film The Pick-Up. He later went on to be an executive producer for the live action series The Fairly OddParents: Fairly Odder based on the animated series The Fairly OddParents.

References

External links

American television directors
Living people
Year of birth missing (living people)